This is a list of schools in Finland, listed by region.

Central Finland
Tikkakoski secondary school
Viitaniemi School

Northern Ostrobothnia
Laanila Highschool
Liminganlahden yhtenäiskoulu
Limingan lukio
Oulu International School
Oulun Lyseon Lukio
Oulun Suomalaisen Yhteiskoulun Lukio

Northern Savonia
Kuopion Lyseon lukio
Kuopio Senior High of Music and Dance

Ostrobothnia
Vasa övningsskola

Pirkanmaa
Nokian lukio
Tampere College
Tietolan koulu

Satakunta
Porin Lyseo
West Finland College

Southwest Finland
Katedralskolan i Åbo
Salo Upper Secondary School
Turku International School
Turun normaalikoulu

Uusimaa
Alppila Upper Secondary School
Deutsche Schule Helsinki
The English School (Helsinki)
Helsingin luonnontiedelukio
Helsingin normaalilyseo
Helsingin Suomalainen Yhteiskoulu
Helsingin yhteislyseo
International School of Helsinki
Jokela High School
Postipuu School
Ressu Comprehensive School
Ressu Upper Secondary School
Tikkurilan lukio
  Tölö Upper Secondary School

See also

Education in Finland
List of universities in Finland
List of polytechnics in Finland

 
Finland
Finland
Schools
Schools
Schools